The Northern constituency (No.10) is a Russian legislative constituency covering the northern areas of Dagestan. Until 2007 the constituency covered the entirety of Makhachkala but in 2015 it shedded Leninsky City District to Central constituency.

Members elected

Election results

1993

|-
! colspan=2 style="background-color:#E9E9E9;text-align:left;vertical-align:top;" |Candidate
! style="background-color:#E9E9E9;text-align:left;vertical-align:top;" |Party
! style="background-color:#E9E9E9;text-align:right;" |Votes
! style="background-color:#E9E9E9;text-align:right;" |%
|-
|style="background-color:"|
|align=left|Magomed Tolboyev
|align=left|Independent
|
|26.48%
|-
|style="background-color:"|
|align=left|Ilyas Umakhanov
|align=left|Independent
| -
|15.57%
|-
| colspan="5" style="background-color:#E9E9E9;"|
|- style="font-weight:bold"
| colspan="3" style="text-align:left;" | Total
| 
| 100%
|-
| colspan="5" style="background-color:#E9E9E9;"|
|- style="font-weight:bold"
| colspan="4" |Source:
|
|}

1995

|-
! colspan=2 style="background-color:#E9E9E9;text-align:left;vertical-align:top;" |Candidate
! style="background-color:#E9E9E9;text-align:left;vertical-align:top;" |Party
! style="background-color:#E9E9E9;text-align:right;" |Votes
! style="background-color:#E9E9E9;text-align:right;" |%
|-
|style="background-color:"|
|align=left|Gamid Gamidov
|align=left|Independent
|
|22.68%
|-
|style="background-color:"|
|align=left|Magomed Tolboyev (incumbent)
|align=left|Independent
|
|13.94%
|-
|style="background-color:"|
|align=left|Atay Aliyev
|align=left|Union of Muslims
|
|13.14%
|-
|style="background-color:"|
|align=left|Gadzhi Makhachev
|align=left|Independent
|
|7.68%
|-
|style="background-color:"|
|align=left|Stanislav Ilyasov
|align=left|Independent
|
|7.55%
|-
|style="background-color:"|
|align=left|Magomed Atavov
|align=left|Independent
|
|6.39%
|-
|style="background-color:"|
|align=left|Dalgat Dzhanakavov
|align=left|Communist Party
|
|4.80%
|-
|style="background-color:"|
|align=left|Isagadzhi Gadzhiyev
|align=left|Independent
|
|2.67%
|-
|style="background-color:"|
|align=left|Magomed Guseynov
|align=left|Independent
|
|2.30%
|-
|style="background-color:"|
|align=left|German Kirilenko
|align=left|Independent
|
|2.03%
|-
|style="background-color:#E98282"|
|align=left|Asya Ismailova
|align=left|Women of Russia
|
|0.88%
|-
|style="background-color:#265BAB"|
|align=left|Azim Asvarov
|align=left|Russian Lawyers' Association
|
|0.54%
|-
|style="background-color:#3A46CE"|
|align=left|Magomed Sutayev
|align=left|Democratic Choice of Russia – United Democrats
|
|0.54%
|-
|style="background-color:"|
|align=left|Gadzhi Magomedov
|align=left|Independent
|
|0.47%
|-
|style="background-color:"|
|align=left|Nurmagomed Gazimagomedov
|align=left|Independent
|
|0.40%
|-
|style="background-color:"|
|align=left|Akhmedkhan Guseynov
|align=left|Liberal Democratic Party
|
|0.26%
|-
|style="background-color:#000000"|
|colspan=2 |against all
|
|1.56%
|-
| colspan="5" style="background-color:#E9E9E9;"|
|- style="font-weight:bold"
| colspan="3" style="text-align:left;" | Total
| 
| 100%
|-
| colspan="5" style="background-color:#E9E9E9;"|
|- style="font-weight:bold"
| colspan="4" |Source:
|
|}

1996

|-
! colspan=2 style="background-color:#E9E9E9;text-align:left;vertical-align:top;" |Candidate
! style="background-color:#E9E9E9;text-align:left;vertical-align:top;" |Party
! style="background-color:#E9E9E9;text-align:right;" |Votes
! style="background-color:#E9E9E9;text-align:right;" |%
|-
|style="background-color:green"|
|align=left|Nadirshakh Khachilayev
|align=left|Union of Muslims
|-
|27.00%
|-
| colspan="5" style="background-color:#E9E9E9;"|
|- style="font-weight:bold"
| colspan="3" style="text-align:left;" | Total
| -
| 100%
|-
| colspan="5" style="background-color:#E9E9E9;"|
|- style="font-weight:bold"
| colspan="4" |Source:
|
|}

1999

|-
! colspan=2 style="background-color:#E9E9E9;text-align:left;vertical-align:top;" |Candidate
! style="background-color:#E9E9E9;text-align:left;vertical-align:top;" |Party
! style="background-color:#E9E9E9;text-align:right;" |Votes
! style="background-color:#E9E9E9;text-align:right;" |%
|-
|style="background-color:"|
|align=left|Gadzhi Makhachev
|align=left|Independent
|
|62.39%
|-
|style="background:#1042A5"| 
|align=left|Ruslan Suleymanov
|align=left|Union of Right Forces
|
|9.09%
|-
|style="background-color:#084284"|
|align=left|Khaybula Abdulgapurov
|align=left|Spiritual Heritage
|
|7.12%
|-
|style="background-color:#000000"|
|colspan=2 |against all
|
|14.75%
|-
| colspan="5" style="background-color:#E9E9E9;"|
|- style="font-weight:bold"
| colspan="3" style="text-align:left;" | Total
| 
| 100%
|-
| colspan="5" style="background-color:#E9E9E9;"|
|- style="font-weight:bold"
| colspan="4" |Source:
|
|}

2003

|-
! colspan=2 style="background-color:#E9E9E9;text-align:left;vertical-align:top;" |Candidate
! style="background-color:#E9E9E9;text-align:left;vertical-align:top;" |Party
! style="background-color:#E9E9E9;text-align:right;" |Votes
! style="background-color:#E9E9E9;text-align:right;" |%
|-
|style="background-color:#FFD700"|
|align=left|Gadzhi Makhachev (incumbent)
|align=left|People's Party
|
|67.16%
|-
|style="background-color:"|
|align=left|Shamil Amirilayev
|align=left|Independent
|
|13.84%
|-
|style="background-color:#000000"|
|colspan=2 |against all
|
|15.31%
|-
| colspan="5" style="background-color:#E9E9E9;"|
|- style="font-weight:bold"
| colspan="3" style="text-align:left;" | Total
| 
| 100%
|-
| colspan="5" style="background-color:#E9E9E9;"|
|- style="font-weight:bold"
| colspan="4" |Source:
|
|}

2016

|-
! colspan=2 style="background-color:#E9E9E9;text-align:left;vertical-align:top;" |Candidate
! style="background-color:#E9E9E9;text-align:left;vertical-align:top;" |Party
! style="background-color:#E9E9E9;text-align:right;" |Votes
! style="background-color:#E9E9E9;text-align:right;" |%
|-
|style="background-color: " |
|align=left|Umakhan Umakhanov
|align=left|United Russia
|
|67.50%
|-
|style="background-color:"|
|align=left|Dzhamal Kasumov
|align=left|Independent
|
|14.19%
|-
|style="background-color:"|
|align=left|Zalimkhan Valiyev
|align=left|Independent
|
|7.70%
|-
|style="background-color:"|
|align=left|Murzadin Avezov
|align=left|Communist Party
|
|4.29%
|-
|style="background-color:"|
|align=left|Kamil Davdiyev
|align=left|A Just Russia
|
|1.90%
|-
|style="background-color:"|
|align=left|Oleg Melnikov
|align=left|Independent
|
|1.37%
|-
|style="background-color:"|
|align=left|Dzhafar Dzhafarov
|align=left|Liberal Democratic Party
|
|1.16%
|-
|style="background-color:"|
|align=left|Muslim Dzhamalutdinov
|align=left|The Greens
|
|0.72%
|-
|style="background:"| 
|align=left|Ruslan Magomedov
|align=left|People's Freedom Party
|
|0.67%
|-
| colspan="5" style="background-color:#E9E9E9;"|
|- style="font-weight:bold"
| colspan="3" style="text-align:left;" | Total
| 
| 100%
|-
| colspan="5" style="background-color:#E9E9E9;"|
|- style="font-weight:bold"
| colspan="4" |Source:
|
|}

2021

|-
! colspan=2 style="background-color:#E9E9E9;text-align:left;vertical-align:top;" |Candidate
! style="background-color:#E9E9E9;text-align:left;vertical-align:top;" |Party
! style="background-color:#E9E9E9;text-align:right;" |Votes
! style="background-color:#E9E9E9;text-align:right;" |%
|-
|style="background-color:"|
|align=left|Abdulkhakim Gadzhiyev
|align=left|United Russia
|
|84.87%
|-
|style="background-color:"|
|align=left|Murzadin Avezov
|align=left|Communist Party
|
|5.78%
|-
|style="background-color:"|
|align=left|Murat Payzulayev
|align=left|A Just Russia — For Truth
|
|3.48%
|-
|style="background-color:"|
|align=left|Shakhnavaz Guseynov
|align=left|Liberal Democratic Party
|
|1.82%
|-
|style="background-color:"|
|align=left|Vladimir Telikhov
|align=left|Rodina
|
|0.88%
|-
|style="background-color: " |
|align=left|Rashid Yanikov
|align=left|New People
|
|0.74%
|-
|style="background-color:"|
|align=left|Irina Dibirova
|align=left|The Greens
|
|0.61%
|-
|style="background-color:"|
|align=left|Vagid Devletkhanov
|align=left|Yabloko
|
|0.54%
|-
|style="background-color: "|
|align=left|Kurban Ramazanov
|align=left|Party of Pensioners
|
|0.53%
|-
| colspan="5" style="background-color:#E9E9E9;"|
|- style="font-weight:bold"
| colspan="3" style="text-align:left;" | Total
| 
| 100%
|-
| colspan="5" style="background-color:#E9E9E9;"|
|- style="font-weight:bold"
| colspan="4" |Source:
|
|}

Notes

References 

Russian legislative constituencies
Politics of Dagestan